ROKS Sinseong is the name of two Republic of Korea Navy warships:

Republic of Korea Navy ship names